Marantao, officially the Municipality of Marantao (Maranao: Inged a Marantao), is a 2nd class municipality in the province of Lanao del Sur, Philippines. According to the 2020 census, it has a population of 37,763 people.

Marantao (Merantau) is a Malay word that means "to go on adventure, travel or hunting or even on a war expedition".

Geography

Barangays
Marantao is politically subdivided into 34 barangays.

Climate

Demographics

Economy

Culture

Kawayan Torogan
The Kawayan Torogan is the oldest known torogan in the Philippines. It is a traditional Maranao house built for royal Maranao families. There was once a campaign where the people wanted the municipalities of Marantao and Tugaya to pass an ordinance where the architectural scheme of the two towns will follow only the totogan style, in effect, preserve the Maranao people's most royal architectural style and lead to the first two towns with a planned town landscape under an indigenous Maranao architecture. However, the campaign led to deaf ears due to little funding available.

References

External links
Marantao Profile at the DTI Cities and Municipalities Competitive Index
[ Philippine Standard Geographic Code]
Philippine Census Information
Local Governance Performance Management System

Municipalities of Lanao del Sur
Populated places on Lake Lanao